Proeulia triquetra is a species of moth of the family Tortricidae. It is found in Chile.

The length of the forewings is 9–11 mm. The forewings are brownish ocherous with brown reticulation (a net-like pattern). There is  a paler, whitish-ocherous, longitudinal streak on the dorsum. The hindwings are hazel greyish to lead grey.

References

Moths described in 1964
Proeulia
Endemic fauna of Chile